Erluin, also found in the forms Erluinus, Erlwin, Eorlewinus, Herluin, and Harlewin, is a medieval name, composed of the Germanic elements erl, meaning free man or noble man, and win, meaning friend.

Notable bearers of the name include:
Erluin (nobleman), prefect of the palace at Ingelheim c. 874
Erluin I of Gembloux, abbot of Gembloux 946–987
Erluin II of Gembloux, abbot of Gembloux 991–1012
Erluin of Cambrai, bishop of Cambrai 995–1012
Herluin de Conteville (died c. 1066), step-father of William the Conqueror
Herluin of Bec (died 1078), founder of the abbey of Bec

References

Germanic masculine given names